The New Rights Party (NRP), also translated as New Conservative Party (NCP), was a political party in Georgia. It was an associate member of the International Democrat Union and applicant of the European People's Party.

On , the New Rights Party joined the Republican Party of Georgia in a new opposition alliance. Both parties united in "The Alliance for Georgia" led by Irakli Alasania, Georgia's ex-envoy to the United Nations in February 2009.

Following the establishment of Lelo for Georgia political party in 2019, both David Usupashvili's Development Movement and the New Rights Party merged with the new party and became part of Lelo for Georgia.

Establishment
The idea to establish the NRP began to emerge during the time when Eduard Shevardnadze was still President and his Citizens’ Union of Georgia (CUG) was an influential force on the political stage of the country.

After formation, despite small membership, the New Faction (at that point there were only ten members) managed to significantly change the situation in the Parliament.

The original membership of the New Faction consisted of David Gamkrelidze (chairman), Levan Gachechiladze, Pikria Chikhradze, Gia Karkarashvili, Irakli Iashvili, David Saganelidze, David Koghuashvili, Dodo Shelia, Giorgi Kvirikashvili, and Valeri Kvaratskhelia.

On , on the basis of the New Faction, New Movement, and Neo-Conservative Union, a new political partythe New Conservative Party of Georgiawas formed. Levan Gachechiladze was elected as NRP chairman and David Gamkrelidze as co-chairman.

Elections
In only a year from its formation, the New Rights Party achieved considerable results. After the victory in the local elections, the party set itself preparing for the parliamentary elections. A few months prior to the  parliamentary elections, the NRP 2nd Congress elected David Gamkrelidze as a new chairman. The New Conservatives managed to successfully overcome the established seven per cent threshold. A number of parties boycotted the  election results accusing the authorities of fraud. This triggered fierce public discontent nationwide, which eventually resulted in the toppling of Shevardnadze's regime in the Rose Revolution.

Despite the just outrage of the people, the NRP considered it unacceptable that the government should be changed by means of street demonstrations, as they believed it to be unconstitutional.

Participating in the repeat elections of 2004, the New Conservatives passed the seven per cent threshold once again. The NRP united with another center-right partyIndustry will Save Georgiaand formed a Coalition Right Opposition.

See also 
:Category:New Rights Party politicians

References 

2001 establishments in Georgia (country)
2019 disestablishments in Georgia (country)
Centre-right parties in Georgia (country)
Defunct conservative parties
Defunct political parties in Georgia (country)
International Democrat Union member parties
Political parties disestablished in 2019
Political parties established in 2001